Kirste is a surname. Notable people with the surname include:

Gerd Kirste (1918–2014), Norwegian politician
Matthias Kirste, German cinematographer
Stephan Kirste (born 1962), German legal scholar and professor

See also
Kirsti